Self-enhancement is a type of motivation that works to make people feel good about themselves and to maintain self-esteem. This motive becomes especially prominent in situations of threat, failure or blows to one's self-esteem. Self-enhancement involves a preference for positive over negative self-views.
It is one of the three self-evaluation motives along with self-assessment (the drive for an accurate self-concept) and self-verification (the drive for a self-concept congruent with one's identity).
Self-evaluation motives drive the process of self-regulation, that is, how people control and direct their own actions.

There are a variety of strategies that people can use to enhance their sense of personal worth. For example, they can downplay skills that they lack or they can criticise others to seem better by comparison. These strategies are successful, in that people tend to think of themselves as having more positive qualities and fewer negative qualities than others. Although self-enhancement is seen in people with low self-esteem as well as with high self-esteem, these two groups tend to use different strategies. People who already have high esteem enhance their self-concept directly, by processing new information in a biased way. People with low self-esteem use more indirect strategies, for example by avoiding situations in which their negative qualities will be noticeable.

There are controversies over whether or not self-enhancement is beneficial to the individual, and over whether self-enhancement is culturally universal or specific to Western individualism.

Levels
Self-enhancement can occur in many different situations and under many different guises. The general motive of self-enhancement can have many differing underlying explanations, each of which becomes more or less dominant depending on the situation.

The explanations of the self-enhancement motive can occur in different combinations. Self-enhancement can occur as an underlying motive or personality trait without occurring as an observed effect.

Dimensions
Both the extent and the type of self-enhancement vary across a number of dimensions.

Self-advancement vs. self-protection
Self-enhancement can occur by either self-advancing or self-protecting, that is either by enhancing the positivity of one's self-concept, or by reducing the negativity of one's self-concept. Self-protection appears to be the stronger of the two motives, given that avoiding negativity is of greater importance than encouraging positivity. However, as with all motivations, there are differences between individuals. For example, people with higher self-esteem appear to favour self-advancement, whereas people with lower self-esteem tend to self-protect. This highlights the role of risk: to not defend oneself against negativity in favour of self-promotion offers the potential for losses, whereas whilst one may not gain outright from self-protection, one does not incur the negativity either. People high in self-esteem tend to be greater risk takers and therefore opt for the more risky strategy of self-advancement, whereas those low in self-esteem and risk-taking hedge their bets with self-protection.

Public vs. private
Self-enhancement can occur in private or in public. Public self-enhancement is obvious positive self-presentation, whereas private self enhancement is unnoticeable except to the individual. The presence of other people i.e. in public self-enhancement, can either augment or inhibit self-enhancement. Whilst self-enhancement may not always take place in public it is nevertheless still influenced by the social world, for example via social comparisons.

Central vs. peripheral
Potential areas of self-enhancement differ in terms how important, or central, they are to a person. Self-enhancement tends to occur more in the domains that are the most important to a person, and less in more peripheral, less important domains.

Candid vs. tactical
Self-enhancement can occur either candidly or tactically. Candid self-enhancement serves the purpose of immediate gratification whereas tactical self-enhancement can result in potentially larger benefits from delayed gratification.

Tactical self-enhancement is often preferred over candid self-enhancement as overt self-enhancement is socially displeasing for those around it. Narcissism is an exemplification of extreme candid self-enhancement.

Types
Self-enhancement does not just occur at random. Its incidence is often highly systematic and can occur in any number of ways in order to achieve its goal of inflating perceptions of the self. Importantly, we are typically unaware that we are self-enhancing. Awareness of self-enhancing processes would highlight the facade we are trying to create, revealing that the self we perceive is in fact an enhanced version of our actual self.

Self-serving attribution bias

Self-enhancement can also affect the causal explanations people generate for social outcomes. People have a tendency to exhibit a self-serving attribution bias, that is to attribute positive outcomes to one's internal disposition but negative outcomes to factors beyond one's control e.g. others, chance or circumstance. In short, people claim credit for their successes but deny responsibilities for their failures. The self-serving attribution bias is very robust, occurring in public as well as in private, even when a premium is placed on honesty. People most commonly manifest a self-serving bias when they explain the origin or events in which they personally had a hand or a stake.

Explanations for moral transgressions follow similar self-serving patterns, as do explanations for group behaviour. The ultimate attribution error is the tendency to regard negative acts by one's out-group and positive acts by one's in-group as essential to their nature i.e. attributable to their internal disposition and not a product of external factors. This may reflect the operation of the self-serving bias refracted through social identification.

Selectivity

Selective memory

People sometimes self-enhance by selectively remembering their strengths rather than weaknesses. This pattern of selective forgetting has been described as mnemic neglect. Mnemic neglect may reflect biases in the processing of information at either encoding, retrieval or retention.
Biases at encoding occur via selective attention and selective exposure.
Biases at retrieval and retention occur via selective recall.
The role of mnemic neglect can be emphasised or reduced by the characteristics of a certain behaviour or trait. For example, after receiving false feedback pertaining to a variety of behaviours, participants recalled more positive behaviours than negative ones, but only when the behaviours exemplified central not peripheral traits and only when feedback pertained to the self and not to others. Similar findings emerge when the to-be-recalled information is personality traits, relationship promoting or undermining behaviours, frequencies of social acts, and autobiographical memories.

Selective acceptance and refutation
Selective acceptance involves taking as fact self-flattering or ego-enhancing information with little regard for its validity. Selective refutation involves searching for plausible theories that enable criticism to be discredited. A good example of selective acceptance and refutation in action would be: Selective acceptance is the act of accepting as valid an examination on which one has performed well without consideration of alternatives, whereas selective refutation would be mindfully searching for reasons to reject as invalid an examination on which one has performed poorly.

Concordant with selective acceptance and refutation is the observation that people hold a more critical attitude towards blame placed upon them, but a more lenient attitude to praise that they receive. People will strongly contest uncongenial information but readily accept at without question congenial information

Strategies

Strategic social comparisons

The social nature of the world we live in means that self-evaluation cannot take place in an absolute nature – comparison to other social beings is inevitable. Many social comparisons occur automatically as a consequence of circumstance, for example within an exam sitting social comparisons of intellect may occur to those sitting the same exam. However, the strength of the self-enhancement motive can cause the subjective exploitation of scenarios in order to give a more favourable outcome to the self in comparisons between the self and others. Such involuntary social comparisons prompt self-regulatory strategies.

Self-esteem moderates the beneficial, evaluative consequences of comparisons to both inferior and superior others. People with higher self-esteem are more optimistic about both evading the failures and misfortunes of their inferiors and about securing the successes and good fortunes of their superiors.

Upward social comparisons
An upwards social comparison involves comparing oneself to an individual perceived to be superior to or better than oneself. Upwards social comparison towards someone felt to be similar to oneself can induce self-enhancement through assimilation of the self and other's characteristics, however this only occurs when:
The gap between the self and the comparison target is not too large;
The skill or success being compared is attainable;
The comparison target is perceived as a competitor.
Where assimilation does not occur as a result of a social comparison, contrast can instead occur which can lead to upwards social comparisons providing inspiration. A single operationalisation of self-enhancement can be influenced by a variety of motives and thus can be coordinated with both positive and negative outcomes.  Those who misperceive their performance (self-enhancers and self-effacers) tend to have a lower academic achievement, lower subsequent performance. These results appear to be culturally universal. Surely, it's a false assumption to relate self enhancement to depression.

If self-enhancement is taken to mean rendering more positive judgments of oneself than of others then outcomes are frequently favourable.
If self-enhancement is taken to mean the rendering of more positive judgements of oneself than others render then outcomes are often untoward.
Which definition is better at measuring self-enhancement has been disputed, as rating oneself more positively than one rates others is not seen as self-enhancement by some researchers.

In some studies, self-enhancement has been shown to have strong positive links with good mental health and in others with bad mental health. Self-enhancing can also have social costs. Whilst promoting resilience amongst survivors of the September 11th terrorist attacks, those who self-enhanced were rated as having decreased social adaptation and honesty by friends and family.

Constraints

Plausibility
Self-enhancement thrives upon the vagueness or ambiguity of evidence. Where criteria are rigidly defined, self-enhancement typically reduces. For example, the above-average effect decreases as clarity and definition of the defined trait increases. The easier it is to verify a behaviour or trait, the less that trait will be subject to self-enhancement. The plausibility of a trait or characteristic given real world evidence moderates the degree to which the self-enhancement of that trait occurs. Selectively recalling instances of desirable traits is moderated by one's actual standing on those traits in reality.

When plausibility reduces the impact of self-enhancement, undesirable evidence often has to be accepted, albeit reluctantly. This typically occurs when all possible interpretations of the evidence in question have been made. The reason for this unwilling acceptance is to maintain effective social functioning, where unqualified self-aggrandizement would otherwise prevent it. People will continue to self-enhance so long as they think they can get away with it.

The constraint of plausibility on self enhancement exists because self-enhancing biases cannot be exploited. Self-enhancement works only under the assumption of rationality – to admit to self-enhancing totally undermines any conclusions one can draw and any possibility of believing its facade, since according to legit rational processes it functions as a genuinely verifiable and accredited improvement.

Mood
Both positive and negative moods can reduce the presence of the self-enhancement motive. The effects of mood on self-enhancement can be explained by a negative mood making the use self-enhancing tactics harder, and a positive mood making their use less necessary in the first place.

The onset of a positive mood can make people more receptive to negative diagnostic feedback. Past successes are reviewed with expectation of receiving such positive feedback, presumably to buffer their mood.

Depression has quite a well-evidenced link with a decrease in the motive to self-enhance. Depressives are less able to self-enhance in response to negative feedback than non-depressive controls. Having a depressive disposition decreases the discrepancy between one's own estimates of one's virtues and the estimates of a neutral observer, namely by increasing modesty. Illusions of control are moderated by melancholy. However, whilst the self-ratings of depressives are more in line with those of neutral observers than the self ratings of normals, the self ratings of normals are more in line with those of friends and family than the self ratings of depressives.

Social context and relationships
The presence of the motive to self-enhance is dependent on many social situations, and the relationships shared with the people in them. Many different materialisations of self-enhancement can occur depending on such social contexts:
The self-enhancement motive is weaker during interactions with close and significant others.
When friends (or previous strangers whose intimacy levels have been enhanced) cooperate on a task, they do not exhibit a self-serving attribution bias.
Casual acquaintances and true strangers however do exhibit a self-serving attribution bias.
Where no self-serving bias is exhibited in a relationship, a betrayal of trust in the relationship will reinstate the self-serving bias. This corresponds to findings that relationship satisfaction is inversely correlated with the betrayal of trust.
Both mutual liking and expectation of reciprocity appear to mediate graciousness in the presence of others.
Whilst people have a tendency to self-present boastfully in front of strangers, this inclination disappears in the presence of friends.
Others close to the self are generally more highly evaluated than more distant others.

Culture
Psychological functioning is moderated by the influence of culture. There is much evidence to support a culture-specific view of self-enhancement.

Self-enhancement appears to be a phenomenon largely limited to Western cultures, where social ties are looser than in the East. This is concordant with empirical evidence highlighting relationship closeness as a constraint on self-enhancement. The self-improvement motive, as an aspiration towards a possible self may also moderate a variety of psychological processes in both independent and interdependent cultures.

There are nevertheless signs that self-enhancement is not completely absent in interdependent cultures. Chinese schoolchildren rate themselves highly on the dimension of competence, and Taiwanese employees rate themselves more favourably than their employers do, both of which show self-enhancing tendencies in Eastern cultures.

One possible explanation for the observed differences in self-enhancement between cultures is that they may occur through differences in how candidly of tactically the motive to self-enhance is acted upon, and not due to variations in the strength of motive. Alternatively, self-enhancement may be represented only in terms of the characteristics that are deemed important by individuals as they strive to fulfil their culturally prescribed roles.

The issue over whether self-enhancement is universal or specific to Western cultures has been contested within modern literature by two researchers — Constantine Sedikides and Steven Heine. Sedikides argues that self-enhancement is universal, and that different cultures self-enhance in domains important in their culture. Heine on the other hand describes self-enhancement as a predominantly Western motive.

Other motives
It is an exaggeration to say that self-enhancement is the dominant self-evaluation motive. Many controversies exist regarding the distinction between the self-evaluation motives, and there are situations in which motives asides from self-enhancement assume priority.
The self-assessment motive is often contrasted with the self-enhancement motive due to the relative adaptiveness of each approach within social interactions.
The self-verification motive is often challenged by supporters of the self-enhancement as being unfeasible as it often appears implausible.
The self-improvement motive is often taken to be the physical manifestation of the self-enhancement motive i.e. the act of attaining desired positive self views.
Where the truth about oneself worsens or varies it gradually becomes less feasible to satisfy all motives simultaneously.

In an attempt to compare the self-evaluation motives (excluding self-improvement) a self-reflection task was employed. Participants were asked to choose the question they would most likely ask themselves in order to determine whether they possessed a certain personality trait. On the whole, people self-enhanced more than they self-assessed or self-verified. People chose higher diagnosticity questions concerning central, positive traits than central, negative ones, and answered yes more often to central, positive than negative questions. Also, people self-verified more than the self-assessed, and chose more questions overall concerning relatively certain central traits than relatively uncertain peripheral traits.

Other factors
Cognitive load: Where people are in situations of great cognitive load, the tendency to self-enhance increases, almost as if instinctive. People are quicker to agree with possessing positive traits and slower to reject having negative traits.
Modifiability: Where a trait or characteristic is seen as unchangeable people are more self-enhancing versus perceiving the trait to be modifiable.
Diagnosticity: Where a trait or characteristic is seen as highly diagnostic people are less likely to self-enhance, for fear of being caught out in the process of an erroneous attempt at self enhancement as neurosis.

See also
 Identity (social science)
 Individualistic culture
 Basking in reflected glory
 Memory
 Raison oblige theory
 Self-control
 Self-categorization theory
 Self-determination theory
 Self-evaluation maintenance theory
 Self-knowledge (psychology)

References

Notes

Sources

Further reading
 Edward Chin-Ho Chang: Self-Criticism and Self-Enhancement. American Psychological Association, 2008 
 
 Mark R Leary & June Price Tangney: Handbook of Self and Identity. Guilford Press, 2005

External links
 Sedikides vs. Heine debate (videos)
 Constantine Sedikides' Home Page;
 Home Page of Steven Heine
 University of Southampton's Centre for Research on Self and Identity Home Page
 International Society for Self and Identity.

Positive mental attitude
Psychological attitude
Conceptions of self